Phu Quoc Prison is a prison in Phú Quốc, southern Vietnam (today it is in Kiên Giang Province. The prison was built in  1949–1950 by French colonialists as a place to detain political dissidents. During the Vietnam War, it was used for detention of captured Viet Cong and North Vietnamese soldiers. Many of the high ranking leaders of Vietnam were detained here. It is ranked a special historical relic of national significance by the government of Vietnam. The prison was closed after the country united, but is currently open for visitors.

Abusive Treatment of POWs in Phu Quoc Prison
A Red Cross team visited Phu Quoc Prison in 1969 and  1972. Inspections from the ICRC found that many POWs showed signs of inadequate food supplies, poor medical care, and physical beatings.

References

External links

Phu Quoc Prison web site
Ex-commando recalls the horror of jail
Savage criminals in Phu Quoc Prison

Buildings and structures in Kiên Giang province
Defunct prisons in Vietnam
War crimes in Vietnam
Vietnam War prisoner of war camps
Vietnam War sites
Torture in Vietnam
Vietnam War crimes by South Vietnam